Benfer is a surname. Notable people with the surname include:

 Friedrich Benfer (1905–1996), Italian film actor
 Haps Benfer (1893–1966), American football and basketball player

See also
 Bender (surname)